Oyggjaframi (marx-leninistar) or OF(m-l) – Advancement for the Islands (Marxist-Leninist) – was a communist organization in the Faroe Islands. 

In 1968 the Copenhagen-based Faroese association Oyggjaframi had founded a branch in Tórshavn. Whilst the Copenhagen branch continued to function as a broad socialist discussion club, a tendency emerged within the Tórshavn branch calling for the building of a communist party on the basis of Marxism-Leninism-Mao Zedong Thought. At the Oyggjaframi congress in 1972 the organization was split, with the Copenhagen branch continuing to function as Faroese Socialists and the Tórshavn branch constituting OFML.

As of 1975, Hermann Oskarsson was chairman of OFML. The 1975 congress of OFML adopted 5 slogans outlining the priorities of the organization;
Studies as the central activity
Consolidate and expand democratic centralism
Strike roots in the working class
Lead the popular movement against the EEC
Publish a communist workers newspaper

OFML published the first issue of Arbeiðið May 1, 1976.

Initially OF(m-l) took part in the Nordic cooperation of Marxist-Leninist parties that included Arbeidernes Kommunistparti of Norway, Kommunistiska Förbundet Marxist-Leninisterna of Sweden, Kommunistisk Arbejderparti of Denmark, Marxist-Leninist Groups of Finland, and Einingarsamtök Kommúnista (marx-lenínistar) of Iceland. When the Sino-Albanian split occurred, OFML and EIK(ml) followed the People's Republic of Albania. 

During its last years, OFML kept close contacts with the pro-Albanian Danish Danmarks Kommunistiske Parti/Marxister-Leninister.

References

Defunct political parties in the Faroe Islands
Anti-revisionist organizations
Communism in the Faroe Islands
Defunct communist parties in Denmark
Marxist parties in Denmark